Ackenthwaite is a hamlet in Cumbria, England. In the past (14th century) the spelling for the name of this place was Astenthwhate.

Ackenthwaite has a postbox, a telephone box, a few farms, a small farmers' pub and a few old buildings including the "old workhouse" which was, in fact, a workhouse, then a mental institution, and then a storage warehouse. Later it was converted into flats and now stands as 5 houses. Built up around the old workhouse is the estate of Owlet Ash.

Ackenthwaite was the location for Libby's which is an old factory for Nestle. There is now a small industrial estate on the site.

References

External links

Hamlets in Cumbria
Milnthorpe